Clemson is a city in Pickens and Anderson counties in the U.S. state of South Carolina. Clemson is home to Clemson University; in 2015, the Princeton Review cited the town of Clemson as ranking #1 in the United States for "town-and-gown" relations with its resident university. The population of the city was 17,681 at the 2020 census.

Clemson is part of the Greenville-Spartanburg-Anderson, South Carolina Combined Statistical Area. Most of the city is in Pickens County, which is part of the Greenville-Mauldin-Anderson Metropolitan Statistical Area. A small portion is in Anderson County.

History and background

European Americans settled here after the Cherokee were forced to cede their land in 1819. They had lived at Keowee, and six other towns along the Keowee River as part of their traditional homelands in the Southeast. They migrated and settled in Tennessee and deeper into Georgia and Alabama, before most were subjected to forced Indian Removal in 1839 to Indian Territory (now Oklahoma).

The community was originally named Calhoun. Clemson University, founded in 1889, has developed as a large public university that dominates the town and serves as a cultural center. Its campus developed south of the original town. This was renamed as Clemson in 1943, reflecting its identification with the university. A small, multi-block downtown has some housing, retail and restaurants.

The university provides housing for students, but many students live off campus in a wide variety of apartment complexes. Outside the downtown, there are few paved sidewalks, but some streets have bike paths. The city's comprehensive plan has a historic preservation component to apply to keep a range of structures in the area. 

The Clemson (train) Depot, built in 1893, was renovated in 2001; it now houses the local chamber of commerce and visitor center. The station was temporarily closed in 2016 for a road project, but was reopened in 2019. U.S. Route 123 runs along the northern end of the city and its edges have been developed with typical suburban-style shopping centers.

Development of Clemson College/University
Clemson University was founded as an agricultural college starting in 1889, on the former Fort Hill Plantation of statesman John C. Calhoun, which he had acquired by marriage. The plantation was originally owned by his mother-in-law, mother of his wife Floride. Floride Calhoun inherited the property after her mother's death in 1836 but, under South Carolina law, she likely lost any individual rights to it because of her marriage.

In the meantime, Floride and John C. Calhoun had a daughter named Anna Maria. At age 21, she married Thomas Green Clemson. After her father John C. Calhoun died in 1850; his widow Floride Calhoun gained total ownership of Fort Hill Plantation.

Because Anna Maria was the only living child, she inherited a part of Fort Hill when Floride died in 1866. Anna Maria bequeathed Thomas G. Clemson a portion of the property in her will. When Anna Maria died in 1875, he inherited the plantation. He knew that Anna Maria had wanted the land to be used as the site of an agricultural college, so Thomas Green Clemson bequeathed land for such a college in his will. After his death in 1888, what developed as  Clemson University was founded on that land.

Geography
The city is situated near the northwestern corner of South Carolina in the foothills of the Blue Ridge Mountains while also on the shores of Lake Hartwell.

Climate
Typical of the Upstate, Clemson has a humid subtropical climate (Köppen) characterized by hot, humid summers and cool winters.

National Register of Historical Places
The following places and buildings in Clemson are listed on the National Register of Historic Places:
 Clemson University Historic District I and II
 Clemson College Sheep Barn
 Fort Hill (John C. Calhoun Mansion and Library)
 Hanover House
 Hopewell Plantation - Gen. Andrew Pickens' Home
 J. C. Stribling Barn
 Old Stone Church and Cemetery

Attractions
In addition to Clemson University, the city is home to the South Carolina Botanical Garden, Fort Hill Plantation and Bob Campbell Geology Museum. Lake Hartwell, a reservoir, is a popular recreation area that borders the city on the west. The Blue Ridge Mountains are just  from the city center.
 VISITCLEMSON, the city's tourism office, offers more information on things to do in the area.

Demographics

2000 census
As of the census of 2000, there were 11,939 people, 5,061 households and 2,196 families residing in the city. The population does not reflect the additional on-campus population of Clemson University, which adds roughly 17,000 additional residents for eight months of the year.

The population density was 1,620.6 people per square mile (625.5/km). There were 5,679 housing units at an average density of 770.8 per square mile (297.5/km). The city's racial makeup was 80.98% White, 11.38% African American, 5.73% Asian, 0.11% Native American, 0.03% Pacific Islander, 0.73% from other races, and 1.05% from two or more races. Hispanic or Latino of any race were 1.82% of the population.

There were 5,061 households, out of which 17.8% had children younger than 18 living with them, 35.2% were married couples living together, 5.9% had a female householder with no husband present and 56.6% were non-families. 28.6% of all households were made up of individuals, and 7.7% had someone living alone who was 65 or older. The average household size was 2.30, and the average family size was 2.84.

In the city, the population was spread out, with 14.5% younger than 18, 36.8% from 18 to 24, 20.4% from 25 to 44, 15.5% from 45 to 64, and 12.7% who were 65 older. The median age was 25 years. For every 100 females. there were 106.4 males. For every 100 females age 18 and older, there were 107.5 males.

The median income for a household in the city was $26,892, and the median income for a family was $61,176. Males had a median income of $39,318 versus $28,663 for females. The per capita income for the city was $19,272. About 8.8% of families and 33.1% of the population were below the poverty line, including 13.1% of those under age 18 and 8.4% of those age 65 or over.

2010 census
The 2010 census shows Clemson's population rose to 14,089 in 2012, showing an increase of 0.9% over two years and three months (from April 1, 2010 to July 1, 2012). The population in 2010 consisted of 5,823 households with an average of 2.33 people living in each household. This household quantity includes 2,474 family households, 932 of which had children younger than 18. 37% of these households were married couples, 2.3% male householder with no wife present and 3.2% female householders with no husband present. The rest of these households were composed of non-family households (57.5%) and householders living along (31.3%).

The city of Clemson had a population density of 1,869 persons per square mile. The number of housing units in the city was 6.925. The overall racial distribution of the city was 78.4% white, 8.9% black or African American, 0.3% American Indian and Alaska Native, 8.3% Asian, and 2.2% Hispanic or Latino.
The age distribution for Clemson is as follows: 4.1% under the age of 5 years, 3.3% 5–9 years, 4.4% 10–14 years, 4.3% 15–19 years, 32.6% 20–24 years, 14% 25–34 years, 8.8% 35–44 years, 8.8% 45–54, and 19.7% older than 55.

The median household income was $29,828 and the median family income was $77,704. The median earnings for a male worker (full-time) was $42,597, compared to the median earnings for a female worker (full-time), which was $32,524. The city of Clemson had a per capita income of about $23,906. 17.6% of the population was below the poverty line, 13.2% of that total being families.

2020 census

As of the 2020 United States census, there were 17,681 people, 6,751 households, and 2,571 families residing in the city.

Public safety
The city of Clemson operates the Clemson Police Department, Clemson University Fire Department and Pickens County EMS, for public safety needs. All departments are staffed 24 hours a day, seven days a week. The Clemson University Fire Department has two stations. One is on campus at 1521 Perimeter Road while the second station is at 740 Issaqueena Trail. The Police Department is at 1198 Tiger Boulevard. Pickens County EMS Medic 4 is at 115 Commons Way in Central.

Transportation

Clemson Area Transit (CAT) is a free transportation service that offers fare free service throughout the Clemson, Anderson, Pendleton and Seneca areas. All CAT buses are made accessible for patrons with disabilities and can accommodate any special needs. The CAT buses also provide transfer services to the local Electric City Transit bus in Anderson. Riders can receive vouchers from CAT bus operators in order to continue their ride fare-free on the Anderson shuttles.

The city of Clemson has an Amtrak station at the corner of Calhoun Memorial Highway and College Avenue.  The Crescent Route travels from New Orleans to New York City and stops through the Clemson station (CSN).

The Clemson area is near three major airports. The closest, Greenville-Spartanburg International Airport, is 45 minutes away in Greenville, South Carolina. Hartsfield-Jackson Atlanta International Airport (ATL) is two and a half hours away in Atlanta, Georgia, and Charlotte-Douglas International Airport (CLT) is two and a half hours away, as well, in Charlotte, North Carolina. Many different services provide transportation to and from the airport from the Clemson area, including The Airport Shuttle, Anderson/Clemson Shuttle Service, Yellow Cab and Andrews Airport Services.

Education
The city of Clemson is in the school district of Pickens County. Students living in the city of Clemson attend Clemson Elementary School, RC Edwards Middle School and D.W. Daniel High School.

Clemson Elementary School was originally called the Calhoun-Clemson School and was on College Avenue. In 1964, the school burned down, destroying everything but the cafeteria. The school was rebuilt on Frontage Road and was named Maggie Morrison Elementary School. The old building was renamed the Morrison annex and was used to house the primary grades. After the schools had outgrown their buildings, construction began in 1999 on a new school building on Berkeley Drive. This is now the site of the current Clemson Elementary. Clemson Elementary colors are orange and blue, and its mascot is the tiger cub.

RC Edwards was built and opened in 1971. It currently educates sixth-, seventh- and eighth-graders. The campus is between the cities of Central and Six Mile, and has about 800 students. Its colors are purple and white, and the mascot is the panther.

The current D.W. Daniel High School was constructed in 2010 and had its first class enter the doors for the 2012–2013 school year. The school is named after David Wistar Daniel, a professor at Clemson University, who was invested in the public school system and spent many years on the South Carolina Board of Education. It recently was named one of the best regular public schools in the state by US News magazine. Its colors are blue and gold, and the mascot is the lion. The school is well known for its football team.  In the 2013–2014 season, the team ended the year 14 wins to one loss, which occurred in the 3A State Championship against Myrtle Beach High School.

City government
The city has a City Council and participates as a member of the Pickens County Council. The state senator is Thomas C. Alexander, and the state representative is Jerry Carter.
Clemson City Council consists of an Arts and Culture Commission, a Planning Commission, a Board of Architectural Review and a Board of Zoning Appeals.

The city of Clemson also works directly with the International Town Gown Association (ITGA) that works to provide information on common issues between universities and their neighboring towns.  Two Clemson representatives serve on the ITGA Executive Board: Jim Oswald, ITGA Treasurer, and Beth Bagwell, ITGA Director.

Footnotes
See generally The Routledge Handbook of Contemporary English Pronunciation.

References

External links

 
 City of Clemson official website
 Pickens County EMS 
 Clemson information from Oconeecountry.com

 
Cities in South Carolina
Cities in Anderson County, South Carolina
Cities in Pickens County, South Carolina
Upstate South Carolina